Donato Cannone (born 16 February 1982 in Terlizzi) is an Italian former professional road cyclist.

Major results
2004
 7th Ruota d'Oro
2005
 3rd Overall Giro della Toscana
 1st Stage 1 Giro della Toscana 
2006
 3rd Overall Vuelta a Navarra
2007
 7th Overall Circuit de Lorraine
2008
 4th Giro del Veneto
 5th Coppa Placci
 7th Coppa Bernocchi
2009
 10th GP Industria & Artigianato di Larciano

References

External links

1982 births
Living people
People from Terlizzi
Italian male cyclists
Cyclists from Apulia
Sportspeople from the Metropolitan City of Bari